In labor disputes, a walkout is a labor strike, the act of employees collectively leaving the workplace and withholding labor as an act of protest.

A walkout can also mean the act of leaving a place of work, school, a meeting, a company, or an organization, especially if meant as an expression of protest or disapproval.

A walkout can be seen as different from a strike in that a walkout can occur spontaneously, and need not necessarily involve all the workers present, whereas a strike is often voted on beforehand by the workers, giving notification both to all of the workers and to the company affected.

Walkouts have often been staged against the presence of a speaker or the content of an in-progress speech at a meeting. The protest, which is often a silent, non-violent means of expressing disapproval, is often interpreted as an exercise of the freedom of association while allowing the speaker to exercise the freedom of speech, albeit with a reduced audience in attendance.

Notable walkouts

1968 East Los Angeles 

These were a series of 1968 protests against unequal conditions in Los Angeles Unified School District high schools, beginning on March 6.

Women Factory Walkouts of 1834 and 1836

Background

In the beginning of the 19th century there was a change in economic circumstances with the booming Industrial Revolution and young single women, between ages of fourteen to early twenties felt the need to work to relieve financial pressures from their family and to gain a sense of independence of living on their own.  They left home and began a new life in the mill boarding houses.  While working in the mills they would send some monthly earnings back home to still fulfill the role as a contributing part of the family. However, the majority of their earnings was saved in the bank for their own desires.  Most women who made this change came from a modest farming backgrounds and made the move to areas of New England and Mid Atlantic States.

Economic Crisis of 1834

In the early months of 1834, textile sales were slow and profits were not up to standard to provide sufficient wages for the women mill workers of Lowell, Massachusetts. As a result, wages were cut and the price of room and board went up. The mill factory women saw this wage cut and price increase as an offense to their dignity, social quality, and economic autonomy. The women decided to take action and many started petitions and held meetings during dinner breaks. They pledged that they would quit if the wage rates decreased. On a Friday in February 1834, a sporadic walkout began after a meeting in which an agent of a mill company dismissed a woman factory worker. Protesting began and the women quit work and started parading through the city streets, attempting to persuade other mill women to join. This walkout was short-lived, and by the middle of the next week the women either returned to work or left town. Only about one-sixth of all women workers in Lowell walked out.

Walkout of October 1836

In October 1836, the women workers in the Lowell, Massachusetts factory mills walked out once again for the same reasons as the strike in 1834. The young women saw the wage-cut and the increasing prices of housing board as a direct assault on their social and economic independence, and they wouldn't let the revolting wage-cut and rising prices undermined their status as "daughters of freemen". Furthermore, as influenced by their traditional values, the young women did not accept to be treated as slaves so they protested. In this second walkout however, the women workers were more organized, and the number of workers involved in the strikes were far numerous than the one sixth of all the factory workers in 1834 and this had a greater impact on the success of their operation. The other cause to their success of this second walkout was the economic prosperity of the 1840s; the mills profits were booming and they needed more workers. Therefore, the walkout of 1836 affected the mills greatly because they were short in workers, and the lengthy absence of the women accentuated the impact. As a result, some of the mills were obliged to cut their charges on housing, and they were forced to cooperate with the women workers' organization.

Effects

The women wanted to take a stand for their independence. With the decision making of having walkouts, they portrayed how women started a new revolution with a new idea of feminine autonomy and power. The 1834 and 1836 walkouts symbolized women standing against oppression by employers who wished to lower their wages, as well as increase the price in housing. With these walkouts women took a stand for themselves as well as paved the way for the generations of women to come.

See also

 Strike action
 Lockout
 Boycott

References

Labor disputes